Harun Rashid Mollah is a Bangladesh Nationalist Party politician and the former Member of Parliament of Dhaka-11.

Career
Mollah was elected to parliament from Dhaka- 11 as a Bangladesh Nationalist Party candidate in 1991.

Death
Mollah died in November 1992.

References

Bangladesh Nationalist Party politicians
1992 deaths
5th Jatiya Sangsad members